Hugo Lino Sánchez Miranda (born 10 October 1968) is a Mexican politician from the National Action Party. In 2012 he served as Deputy of the LXI Legislature of the Mexican Congress representing the Federal District.

References

1968 births
Living people
People from Jiutepec
National Action Party (Mexico) politicians
21st-century Mexican politicians
Deputies of the LXI Legislature of Mexico
Members of the Chamber of Deputies (Mexico) for Mexico City